Trident is a 1975 album by jazz pianist McCoy Tyner (1938-2020), his eighth to be released on the Milestone label. It was recorded in February 1975 and features performances by Tyner with bassist Ron Carter (born 1937) and his former John Coltrane bandmate, drummer Elvin Jones (1927–2004). It is available on CD. Unusually, Tyner plays harpsichord and celesta along with piano.

Critical reception

The Allmusic review by Scott Yanow states "Pianist McCoy Tyner's first full-length trio album since 1964 was one of his most popular... this set finds Tyner in peak form".

Track listing
All compositions by McCoy Tyner except as indicated

 "Celestial Chant" - 7:00
 "Once I Loved" (de Moraes, Gilbert, Jobim) - 7:53
 "Elvin (Sir) Jones" - 5:27
 "Land of the Lonely" - 7:33
 "Impressions" (Coltrane) - 5:03
 "Ruby, My Dear" (Monk) - 7:51

Personnel
McCoy Tyner - piano (all tracks), harpsichord (tracks 1 & 4), celeste (tracks 2 & 4)
Ron Carter - bass  
Elvin Jones - drums

References 

McCoy Tyner albums
1975 albums
Milestone Records albums
Albums produced by Orrin Keepnews